This is a list of films which have placed number one at the weekend box office in the United Kingdom during 1997.

Number one films

Highest-grossing films
Highest-grossing films 29 November 1996 to 30 November 1997

See also 
 List of British films — British films by year

References

Chronology

1997
United Kingdom
Box office number-one films